Rasul Bux Palejo (also spelled Rasool Bux Palijo) (21 February 1930 – 7 June 2018) was a Pakistani leftist, Marxist leader from Sindh, scholar and writer. He was a human-rights lawyer and the leader and founder of Awami Tahreek, a progressive and leftist party.

Early life 

Rasool Bux Palijo was born in the village Mungar Khan Palijo, Jungshahi, Sindh on 21 February 1930, to Ali Mohammad Palijo and Laadee Bai. He received his early education at his village and the secondary education at Sindh Madressatul Islam in Karachi. Palijo did his law graduation from Sindh Law College Karachi. He was fluent in Sindhi, Urdu, and English, and later became conversant in Hindi, Arabic, Balochi, Bengali, Punjabi and Persian.

Political work 
A prolific writer and scholar, Palijo served as a Supreme Court lawyer. He was jailed under political charges for more than 11 years especially during the Movement for Restoration of Democracy (MRD) in Pakistan. Most of his prisoner life, he was kept on Kot Lakhpat jail, Punjab during 1980. He declared as "Prisoner of Conscience" by Amnesty International in 1981.

Palijo has earned a place in the pantheon of leaders from South Asia who earned everlasting fame in the struggle against feudalism, martial laws, colonialism, and imperialism. He was one of the leading founders of the Awami National Party, Sindh Mutahida Muhaz, Sindh Qaumi Ittehad, Bazm-e-Sofia-e Sindh, PONM, Sindhi Adabi Sangat, MRD, Anti One-Unit Movement, and 4 March Movement. He founded Awami Tahreek, Sindhi Haree Committee, Sindhiani Tahreek, Sindhi Shagird Tahreek, Sindhi Haree Tahreek, Pakistan Awami Jamhoori Ittehad, Pakistan Awami Tehreek, Sindhi Mazdoor Tahreek, Sindh Intellectual Forum, Sindhi Awam Jo Qomi Itehad, Sindhi Girls Students Organization, Sujaag Bar Tahreek, Sindh Water Committee, 1940 Pakistan Resolution Implementation Committee Awami Jamhoori Tahreek and Anti Greater Thal Canal and Kalabagh Dam Action Committee.

He also launched Neelam Band Karyo and Voter Listoon Sindhi men Chapayo Tahreek. Palijo was one of the leading figures behind the Movement For Restoration of Democracy (MRD). He and his party Awami Tahreek played an active role against illegal Army Operation in Bangladesh and Balochistan and in the Movement of Journalists against General Zia-ul-Haq and in Bhutto Bachayo Tahreek. He was one of the outstanding speakers of Sub-continent, top Constitutional and Criminal Lawyers of Pakistan and the first Sindhi and South Asian Politician who launched and organized the movement against Kalabagh Dam, Violence in Educational Institutions, and against Urban Based Organized Terrorism. He introduced a new non-violent trend of democratic struggles in Sindh by way of Long Marches. He is the author of more than 40 books on numerous subjects, ranging from literature to politics, prison diaries, culture, and poetry, etc. He became the first political prisoner who remained the longest term in jail under political charges for more than 11 years and was declared as Prisoner of Conscience by Amnesty International in 1981. Few months before his release from Jail, his party celebrated his birthday on 21 January, then he went to London on invitation of Amnesty International for his treatment.

In 2015 he split up from his son Ayaz Latif Palijo's Qaumi Awami Tehreek (QAT) and revived Awami Tehreek - the QAT's parent party.

Personal life 

He became well-versed in literature by reading Kant, Hegel, Karl Marx, Vladimir Lenin, Mao Zedong, Mohandas Gandhi and Muhammad Ali Jinnah. He was an outspoken critic of the feudal system and bureaucrats.

He was married four times.

He has six children from his first wife: 1) Jameel Ahmed, 2) Saleem Akhtar, 3) Masood Anwar, 4) Shehnaz (Adi Pado), 5) Ghulam Hyder, and 6) Noor Nabi. Two children from his second wife: 1) Zafar Palijo, 2) Fakhra Qalbani. Later on, He was married to Sindhi singer, activist, and author Zarina Baloch until her death on 25 October 2006. The union yielded a son Ayaz Latif Palijo. Lastly, He was married to an educationist and writer of the Sindhi language, Naseem Thebo. The union yielded two children: 1) Tania Palijo, 2) Anita Aijaz.

Death
On 7 June 2018, he died at a hospital in Karachi. Prior to his death, he was hospitalised for a long time for cardiac and respiratory complications. On 8 June 2018, he was laid to rest in his native village, Mungar Khan Palijo, in Thatta district.

Books
Described as "the author of more than forty books on numerous subjects, ranging from literature to politics, prison dairies, philosophy, culture and poetry", his bibliography includes:

Sindhi
Lat̤īfu shināsī. Lectures on the works of Shah Abdul Latif Bhittai. 
D̤oraju d̤īʼo hathu kare. Lectures chiefly on Sindhi literature.
Māʼūze Tūng. Biography of Mao Zedong.
Chā Sindhiyuni lāʼi mulkī siyāsata ḥarāmu āhe?. Analytical study of anti-Pakistan movements by Sindhi nationalists; a plea for the Sindhis to take an active part in the affairs of Pakistan.

Urdu
Ṣubḥ ho gī. On Sindhi nationalism.

See also
 Jeay Sindh
 Ayaz Latif Palijo
 Bashir Qureshi
 Sindhudesh
 Naveed Qamar
 Zarina Baloch
 Hyder Bux Jatoi
 Awami Tahreek

References

External links
 PAKISTAN: Gov't Fixated on Big-Ticket Water Projects – Critics
 Mr. Rasool Bux Palijo's Interview before his Departure
 Gulf News

1930 births
2018 deaths
Amnesty International prisoners of conscience held by Pakistan
Sindhi people
Sindh Muslim Law College alumni
People from Sindh
Sindh Madressatul Islam University alumni
Pakistani prisoners and detainees
Pakistani lawyers
Pakistani Marxists
Pakistani scholars
Pakistani progressives
Pakistani political writers
Pakistani human rights activists
People from Thatta District